Ryūta, Ryuta or Ryuuta (written: ,  or ) is a masculine Japanese given name. Notable people with the name include:

People 
, Japanese footballer
, Japanese footballer
, Japanese Volleyball player
, Japanese sumo wrestler
, Japanese footballer
, Japanese neuroscientist
, Japanese footballer
, Japanese actor and entertainer
, Japanese film director
, Japanese sumo wrestler
, Japanese sumo wrestler

Fictional characters 
, a character from The Kindaichi Case Files
, a character from the Osu! Tatakae! Ouendan rhythm game duology

Japanese masculine given names